Dutoit is a French surname. Notable people with the surname include:

 Charles Dutoit (born 1936), Swiss conductor
 Frédéric Dutoit (born 1956), French politician from the French Communist Party
 Roger Dutoit (1923–1988), French actor

See also 
 
 Du Toit, South African surname

References 

French-language surnames